J. J. Johnson's Jazz Quintets is a studio album by jazz trombonist J. J. Johnson, released by Savoy Records, containing material from three different recording sessions in 1946, 1947 and 1949. Material from the first two sessions had been previously released on two Savoy EPs, New Trends In Jazz, Vol. 11 (Savoy XP 8047) and Birth of Bop, Vol. 3 (Savoy XP 8086).  The album was re-issued on CD in 1992, and again in 1994 on the Savoy Jazz label.

Track listing
This is the track list for the CD re-issue. All songs were written by J. J. Johnson, except where noted.
"Jay Bird"  – 2:56
"Coppin' the Bop" (Max Roach)  – 2:57
"Jay Jay"  – 3:04
"Mad Be Bop"  – 2:38
"Boneology"  – 2:57
"Down Vernon's Alley"  – 2:32
"Audubon" (Sonny Rollins)  – 2:45
"Don't Blame Me" (Jimmy McHugh, Dorothy Fields)  – 2:46
"Goof Square" (Rollins)  – 2:23
"Bee Jay"  – 2:24
"Yesterdays" (Jerome Kern, Otto Harbach)  – 2:57
"Riffette"  – 2:25

Personnel
J. J. Johnson – trombone
June 26, 1946, tracks 1–4 (New Trends In Jazz, Vol. 11)
Cecil Payne – alto sax
Bud Powell – piano
Leonard Gaskin – bass
Max Roach – drums
December 24, 1947, tracks 5–6, 11–12 (Birth of Bop, Vol. 3)
Leo Parker – baritone sax
Hank Jones – piano
Al Lucas – bass
Shadow Wilson – drums
May 11, 1949, tracks 7–10
Sonny Rollins – tenor sax
John Lewis – piano
Gene Ramey – bass
Shadow Wilson – drums

References

1949 albums
J. J. Johnson albums
Savoy Records albums